Good to Be Bad is the tenth studio album by Whitesnake released in April 2008. It was the band's first album of new studio material in a decade, since 1997's Restless Heart, not including the four new tracks recorded for the 2006 live album Live: In the Shadow of the Blues.

The album charted at number 62 on the Billboard 200 chart, number 8 on the Top Independent albums chart, number 23 on the Canadian Albums Chart and number 7 on the UK Albums Chart.

Tour
After the release of the album, a tour began on 23 March 2008 in Wellington, New Zealand. The Australian concerts were followed by concerts in South America, Europe, Japan and North America. The tour went to forty countries. It ended on 14 June 2009 at Download Festival in Donington Park, UK. Seven songs from the new album were performed. Former Whitesnake band member Adrian Vandenberg guested on two concerts.

Awards
In November 2008, Good to Be Bad won the Classic Rock Award for "Album of the Year".

The Dinosaur Rock Guitar forum honored the album with a 2008 Dino Award for "Best Album of the Year".

Reissue on "Still Good to Be Bad"
On 24 February 2023, Whitesnake and Rhino Entertainment announced the album reissue to celebrate its original 15th anniversary respectively on remixes and remastered versions on the album in 4-CD and 2-LP formats, along with previously unreleased material with current and previous band members' mixes and their demo "Evolutions" set to be released on 28 April 2023. The album cover art is similar to the original release but the track listing and the album title still holds the previous 2011 Japan reissue with bonus tracks taken from their previous live album Live... in the Shadow of the Blues.

Whitesnake also premiered their unreleased music video of "Can You Hear the Wind Blow" on the same day it was announced and began premiering on streaming services also earlier before its official 2023 reissue.

Track listings

Personnel

Whitesnake
David Coverdale – vocals
Doug Aldrich – guitars
Reb Beach – guitars
Timothy Drury – keyboards
Uriah Duffy – bass
Chris Frazier – drums

Production
Produced, engineered and mixed by The Brutal Brothers
Recorded at Casa DALA, Los Angeles & Snakebyte Studios, Lake Tahoe, Nevada
Mixed at Hook City, Lake Tahoe, Nevada
Mastered at DNA, Los Angeles by David Donnelly

Charts

References

External links
 "Planet Rock" Article
 Feature from Doug Aldrich's official website
 Coverdale comments on the album on "MetalNews"
 Uriah Duffy Official Website

Whitesnake albums
2008 albums
SPV/Steamhammer albums
Warner Music Group albums
Rhino Entertainment albums